This is a list of converts to Hinduism from Islam.

List

See also 

 Indian-origin religions
List of converts to Hinduism
 List of Hindus
 List of converts to Islam from Hinduism

References

Hinduism from Islam
Lists of Hindus
Hindu
Hinduism-related lists